Bøsdalafossur is a waterfall in the Faroe Islands that flows from the lake Sørvágsvatn/Leitissvatn and into the Atlantic ocean. It has a height of 30 meters.

References 

Vágar
Waterfalls of the Faroe Islands